Atulia Union is a union parishad in Shyamnagar Upazila of Satkhira District, in Khulna Division, Bangladesh.

References

Unions of Shyamnagar Upazila
Populated places in Satkhira District